The Garment District is a clothing retailer in Cambridge, Massachusetts that opened in 1986 and houses an eclectic array of vintage and contemporary clothing.  The Garment District is also known for its Dollar-A-Pound clothing store.

History
Founded in the 1940s, the company produced "wiping clothes" (i.e. rags) to smokestack industries, such as sugar manufacturing.  The Garment District began as an offshoot of Harbor Textiles. In 1979 as demand began to rise for used clothing Dollar-A-Pound was opened, where one could buy clothing by the pound. Instead of cutting used clothing up for wiping cloths it was now sold as fashion, though without racks or price tags. In the 1980s finding large quantities of vintage 1940s and 50s clothing at Dollar-A-Pound was commonplace.

In 1986 as the demand for used and vintage clothing continued to rise The Garment District was born. Now in addition to Dollar-A-Pound both new & used clothing is sold on racks - traditional style. Hundreds of thousands of pounds of clothing are still sorted on site.

In 2004 The Garment District was under threat of closure. The pressure to turn the buildings into residential condos almost succeeded. With help from the City of Cambridge, among others, The Garment District was able to acquire the buildings.

In 2007 The Garment District merged with Boston Costume.

References

External links
 Official site

Clothing retailers of the United States
Cambridge, Massachusetts
American companies established in 1986
Retail companies established in 1986
Companies based in Massachusetts